During World War II, Operation Saxifrage was a raid by four small Special Air Service teams who landed on the east coast of Italy on the night of 27 October 1943. Despite miserable weather, the team was able to cut the rail line between Ancona and Pescara in several places before being withdrawn by boat on 27 October. Two troopers were captured.

See also
 Operation Candytuft

Conflicts in 1943
World War II British Commando raids
1943 in Italy